Roniel is a given name. It may refer to:

 Roniel Iglesias (born 1988), Cuban boxer
 Roniel Campos (born 1993), Venezuelan cyclist
 Roniel (footballer) (born 1994), Roniel da Silva Costa, Brazilian footballer
 Roniel Raudes (born 1998), Cuban baseball player